E1A may refer to:
Adenovirus early region 1A, a gene
Haplogroup E1a
Shin-Tōmei Expressway (main route), Isewangan Expressway and Shin-Meishin Expressway, route E1A in Japan.